The Frank Hibbard Estate House is a historic house located at 301 North Chiltern Drive in the Deerpath Hill Estates development in Lake Forest, Illinois. The house was built in 1903 for Frank Hibbard of Hibbard, Spencer, Bartlett & Company, which later became True Value Hardware. Architect George Lyon Harvey designed the house in the Mediterranean Revival style; his design featured a terra cotta roof, decorative iron window coverings, and several porches. In 1929, developer Henry Turnbull purchased the property. Turnbull divided the property, which originally occupied a  plot, to create the Second Addition to Deerpath Hill Estates. Architect Stanley Anderson, a colleague of Turnbull and the developer of the original Deerpath Hill Estates, modernized the house in keeping with its Mediterranean design.

The house was added to the National Register of Historic Places on May 12, 2006.

References

Houses completed in 1929
National Register of Historic Places in Lake County, Illinois
Lake Forest, Illinois
Houses on the National Register of Historic Places in Illinois
Houses in Lake County, Illinois
1929 establishments in Illinois